Anodonta is a genus of freshwater mussels in the family Unionidae, the river mussels.

Species
Species in this genus include:
 Anodonta anatina Linné, 1758 – duck mussel
 Anodonta beringiana Middendorff, 1851 – Yukon floater
 Anodonta californiensis I. Lea, 1852 – California floater
 Anodonta cataracta Say, 1817 – eastern floater
 Anodonta couperiana I. Lea, 1840 – barrel floater
 Anodonta cygnea Linné, 1758 – swan mussel
 Anodonta dejecta Lewis, 1875 – woebegone floater
 Anodonta gibbosa Say, 1824
 Anodonta hartfieldorum 
 Anodonta heardi M. E. Gordon and Hoeh, 1995 – Apalachicola floater
 Anodonta imbecillis Say, 1829 synonym Utterbackia imbecillis 
 Anodonta implicata Say, 1829 – alewife floater
 Anodonta kennerlyi I. Lea, 1860 – western floater
 Anodonta nuttalliana Lea, 1838 – winged floater
 Anodonta oregonensis I. Lea, 1838 – Oregon floater
 Anodonta peggyae Johnson, 1965
 Anodonta pseudodopsis Locard, 1883
 Anodonta suborbiculata Say, 1831 – flat floater
 Anodonta wahlamatensis I. Lea, 1838 – Willamette floater; synonym for Anodonta nuttalliana

References

External links
Anodonta. Integrated Taxonomic Information System (ITIS)

 
Bivalve genera
Taxa named by Jean-Baptiste Lamarck